The trial of Philippine president Joseph Estrada (People of the Philippines v. Joseph Estrada, et al., 26558 Sandiganbayan, September 12, 2007) took place between 2001 and 2007 at the Sandiganbayan. Estrada, popularly called Erap, was resigned from office in 2001 during a popular uprising in Metro Manila after an aborted impeachment trial in which he was charged with plunder and perjury. Soon after his ouster, the same charges were filed against him at the Sandiganbayan.

After a lengthy trial, the Sandiganbayan ruled Estrada not guilty of perjury while ruling him as guilty of plunder and sentenced him to reclusión perpetua. All of his co-accused were acquitted.

The trial

Charges filed
A few months after the January 2001 popular uprising that ousted Estrada, the Philippine Ombudsman filed two charges at the Sandiganbayan on April 4, 2001; one for plunder and the other for perjury.

The plunder case consisted of four separate charges: acceptance of 545 million pesos from proceeds of jueteng, an illegal gambling game; misappropriation of 130 million pesos in excise taxes from tobacco; receiving a 189.7-million-peso commission from the sale of the shares of Belle Corporation, a real estate firm; and owning some 3.2 billion pesos in a bank account under the name Jose Velarde.
The minor charge of perjury is for Estrada under-reporting his assets in his 1999 statement of assets, liabilities and net worth and for the illegal use of an alias, namely for the Jose Velarde bank account.

Estrada's son, Jinggoy Estrada, a former senator, and Edward Serapio, his personal lawyer, were his co-accused. Also charged were Charlie Ang, Yolanda Ricaforte, Alma Alfaro, Eleuterio Tan, Delia Rajas, and Jaime Dichaves, who was later added.

The plunder charge was based upon a complaint filed before the ombudsman by Dante Jimenez, human rights lawyer Romeo Capulong, trial lawyer Leonard de Vera, 1971 Constitutional Convention delegate Ramon A. Gonzales, lawyers Antonio T. Carpio and Dennis B. Funa. One complaint was docketed as OMB-0-00-1756 (Romeo T. Capulong, Leonard de Vera and Dennis B. Funa v. Joseph Ejercito Estrada et al.; see Victor Tan Uy v. Office of the Ombudsman et al., G.R. No. 156399-400, June 27, 2008). On January 22, 2001, two days after his implied resignation from office, President Estrada was ordered by the ombudsman to file his counter-affidavit in answer to the complaints. Finding the probable cause, the complaint would be filed as Criminal Case No. 26558.

Arraignment and plea

Prosecution's case
The Philippine government's prosecution team was led by Special Prosecutor Dennis Villa-Ignacio and other government lawyers. Their case against Joseph Estrada was based on the following:

Defense's case
Former President Joseph Estrada's defense panel, led by Estelito Mendoza and composed of former Supreme Court justices and other celebrated Philippine lawyers, based their defense on the following points:

President Estrada recalls the Arroyos plotting with the civil society and the military in January 2000, to take over a year later; 
The House of Representatives impeaching him without debate and voting; 
The Senate blue-ribbon committee not hearing him out; 
The Impeachment Court not citing for contempt the losers in a democratic debate and voting; 
and the Supreme Court conniving with the elite to swear in then-Vice President Gloria Macapagal Arroyo at 12:20 p.m. of January 20, 2001, 
-(Manila Times, September 30, 2007)

1. The whole process is against the constitution.
a) the legal possibility of removing a sitting president is by impeachment.
Paguia, one of Estrada's lawyers, argues
former President Estrada was not convicted and removed by the Senate acting as an Impeachment Court, therefore it is unconstitutional to subject him to the jurisdiction of the Sandiganbayan. 
-(Manila Times, September 14, 2007)

b) the Supreme Court relied on a biblical, not constitutional passage, with President Estrada still in the Palace

c) the same Court created a special division for President Estrada (not done in the case of the Marcoses and the cronies and the military).

d) Actually, the plot to oust President Estrada was planned by the then-Vice President Arroyo, who met with some political and religious leaders calling for a what she called "Transition Government" under her rule.

2. The Sandiganbayan did not find him guilty of stealing a single centavo of public money. (Manila Times, September 30, 2007)

Lead counsel Estelito Mendoza insisted there is no evidence Estrada received bribe money from jueteng lords. There was also no evidence he received commission money or checks from the Belle transactions.
The one who admitted to receiving bribe money from gambling lords was former governor Chavit Singson of Ilocos Sur. But he was not charged as a co-conspirator. He ran for senator in May 2007 but lost.

3. Fabrication of evidence:
Manrique, a former action officer of the Volunteers Against Crime and Corruption (VACC), narrated in his affidavit how he, sometime in the last week of October 2001, was contacted by a lawyer(State Prosecutor Dennis Villa-Ignacio) who represented himself as a member of the prosecution team in the Estrada cases.

Manrique said the lawyer convinced him to file another perjury case against the deposed president since the original case filed
by the Ombudsman was deemed to be weak and insufficient in evidence.
The lawyer added Manrique's complaint against Estrada had to be antedated to make it appear that even before the Ombudsman had filed his own case,

4. Saguisag, one of Estrada's lawyers said the defense will base its legal argument on the prosecution's failure to indicate in the information that Estrada had received jueteng money “by reason of his public office,”
“There was no allegation that it was received by reason of his public office. That’s one of the elements of plunder,” (inquirer, September 2007)

5. The Sandigan special graft court has an image problem. It is not perceived as being impartial or independent or even fair.
Reynato Puno has one of the worst trust ratings for a public figure.
(Manila Times September 12, 2007)

Verdict
Initial reports of the nature of the conviction pronounced Estrada guilty of the PHP 545 million jueteng case and the Belle Corporation case, while the other two charges were dropped.
The sentence of reclusión perpetua also includes the return to the government of the over PHP 200 million Erap Muslim Youth foundation and PHP 189 million Jose Velarde monies, the penalty of civil interdiction, and perpetual absolute exclusion from public office.
The Court also ordered the arrest of all the other co-defendants in the case.

On September 12, 2007, Joseph Estrada was acquitted of perjury but found guilty of plunder and sentenced to reclusión perpetua with the accessory penalties of perpetual disqualification from public office and forfeiture of ill-gotten wealth.

On September 12, 2007, Sandiganbayan's Presiding Justice Teresita de Castro and two other magistrates unanimously acquitted his son, Senator Jinggoy Estrada, and a lawyer Edward Serapio of plunder charges. The Fallo of the 262-page Decision declared the forfeiture in favor of the government: ₱542.701 million (bank accounts including interest), ₱189 million (Jose Velarde accounts including interest) and the Boracay mansion in New Manila, Quezon City.

Only the fallo or dispositive part of two judgments were read (resulting to only 15 minutes judicial proceedings). During the reading of the judgment, witnesses said Joseph Estrada cried; his wife, Luisa Ejercito Estrada, Jackie Ejercito Lopez, San Juan Mayor Joseph Victor "JV" Ejercito, (Estrada's son with Guia Gomez), other family members and mistresses (including, Laarni Enriquez) all wept during the promulgation by the clerk.

Estrada's lawyer Estelito Mendoza stated that Estrada will file a motion for reconsideration (before September 27) of the 262-page Judgment and then appeal the verdict to the High Tribunal. The Philippine Chamber of Commerce and Industry said it will support a presidential pardon for Estrada. Jinggoy Estrada said "The people will receive this with moral outrage and disgust. The time of reckoning will come. That time may not be too far now. This verdict is intended to legitimize the occupancy of an illegal tenant in Malacanang."

Estrada, in Filipino barong tagalog (pineapple fibre dress shirt and cream trousers) with his trademark wristband stated that "I thought the role of justice would prevail here but really it's a kangaroo court." President Gloria Macapagal Arroyo stated that the court's decision must be accepted: "We hope and pray that the rule of law will prevail." Estrada's counsel Rene A.V. Saguisag issued the statement:"It's victors' justice. It's ruling class justice. The special division (of the court) was programmed to convict. We never had a chance." Estrada will appeal the verdict and would be under automatic review at the Supreme Court of the Philippines.

Estrada told AFP that he was resigned for the latest drama in his presidency: "last and best performance of my life." The prosecution's lead counsel Dennis Villa-Ignacio proudly asserted: "It shows that our judicial system really works. This is the last chance for the state to show that we can do it, that we can charge, prosecute and convict a public official regardless of his stature."

Joseph Estrada rose from obscurity to having been top Filipino film star, then hit the mark, by claiming the presidency until destiny sent him to jail. He stated to AFP "I feel depressed, but it's my style not to show it." Before the release of the fatalistic judgment, he warned that he prevent his fans from making street protests.

Estrada returned to his villa in Tanay, Rizal (driven on from a golf cart), to the helicopter) The court permitted him to return to his villa, "until further orders".

Appeal
On September 26, 2007, Joseph Estrada appealed by filing a 63-page motion for reconsideration of the Sandiganbayan judgment penned by Teresita de Castro (submitting 5 legal grounds). Estrada alleged that the court erred "when it convicted him by acquitting his alleged co-conspirators."

On October 5, 2007, the Sandiganbayan's Special Division ruled to have set for October 19, oral argument (instead of a defense reply) on Joseph Estrada's motion for reconsideration. Estrada asked court permission to attend the hearing, since it ordered the prosecution to file comment before October 11.

Pardon and release from detention
On October 22, 2007, Acting Justice Secretary Agnes Devanadera stated that Joseph Estrada is seeking a "full, free, and unconditional pardon" from President Gloria Macapagal Arroyo. Estrada's lawyer Jose Flaminiano wrote Arroyo: "The time has come to end President Estrada's fight for justice and vindication before the courts. Today [Monday], we filed a withdrawal of his Motion for Reconsideration." Estrada, 70, stressed the "delicate condition" of his mother in asking for pardon.

On October 25, 2007, President Gloria Macapagal Arroyo granted executive clemency to Joseph Estrada based on the recommendation by the Department of Justice. Acting Executive Secretary and Press Secretary Ignacio R. Bunye quoted the signed order: "In view hereof in pursuant of the authority conferred upon me by the Constitution, I hereby grant Executive clemency to Joseph Ejercito Estrada, convicted by the Sandiganbayan of plunder and imposed a penalty of reclusion perpetua. He is hereby restored to his civil and political rights."
Bunye noted that Estrada committed in his application not to seek public office, and he would be free from his Tanay resthouse on October 26, noon. On October 26, 2007, after almost seven years of detention, Joseph Estrada was finally released after the Sandiganbayan promulgated the resolution.

Aftermath

On September 14, 2007, chief presidential legal counsel Sergio Antonio Apostol officially stated that Sandiganbayan Justices Teresita de Castro, Diosdado Peralta and Francisco Villaruz Jr. should decline Judicial and Bar Council nomination and await other vacancies to ease pressure on President Gloria Macapagal Arroyo: "Para hindi na maipit ang Presidente (In order to spare the President from pressure), they should withdraw their nomination. Parang iyong nangyari kay Justice (Gregory) Ong (Remember what happened in Justice Gregory S. Ong’s case) ...It’s a sacrifice on her part..Hindi niya maiwanan (ang posisyon) (She cannot leave the Sandiganbayan) because of the case of Joseph Estrada - Erap (Estrada’s nickname)." In the aftermath of the verdict, De Castro, Villaruz and Peralta are now at the receiving end of two unsolicited advices from key officials. Senate of the Philippines Majority Leader Francis Pangilinan, ex-officio member, Judicial and Bar Council stated that the three Sandiganbayan justices "should have the delicadeza [gentleness] not to accept a promotion to the highest tribunal to dispel any suspicion that they pronounced Mr. Estrada guilty expecting a reward from Palace ... We do not want to see a cloud of suspicion over the appointees to the Supreme Court. They should always be above suspicion."

On November 5, 2007, Senator Jinggoy Estrada, in a privileged speech vowed to block the appointment to the Supreme Court of Sandiganbayan Justices Teresita De Castro and Francisco Villaruz, Jr. (who convicted his father - President Joseph Estrada). Jinggoy said that: "Such a promotion would seem like a reward in exchange for the guilty verdict against the deposed President. We are convinced, then and now, that the special court created to exclusively try the case of President Estrada was established precisely to convict him, which is what exactly happened." Also, Joseph Estrada opposed court seizure of his assets, stating that: "These properties are mine. I acquired them way back when I was still a movie actor."

On December 4, Sandiganbayan Special Division chairperson Teresita de Castro was appointed as the new associate justice of the Supreme Court of the Philippines.

On January 10, 2008, Edgardo Urieta, Sandiganbayan chief of the Sheriff and Security Services Office released the two-page report (based on thirteen-page Banco de Oro to the Sandiganbayan Special Division) which discovered intact due to the 2001 levy by BIR distraint - ₱1.107 billion ($1 = ₱41) account of Joseph Estrada: ₱500 million - "promissory note and chattel mortgage"; 450 million shares of Waterfront Philippines valued at ₱427.5 million; and 300 million shares of Wellex Industries worth ₱84 million; cash deposits in a common trust fund investment account of ₱95.76 million.

Reactions
The Philippine government, through Presidential Spokesperson Ignacio Bunye has issued a statement to the effect of the government's respect and deference to the authority of the Sandiganbayan, and the hope that this "sad" episode in the country's history will not "permanently distract" the country from peace and progress.

President Gloria Macapagal Arroyo canceled a scheduled attendance at a gathering of business leaders in Makati City that afternoon due to security reasons. President Arroyo was scheduled to drop by the Philippine Mid-Year Economic Briefing which was to be held 1:30 p.m. at the Rizal Ballroom of the Makati Shangri-La Hotel.

The Philippine Stock Exchange recovered from a two-day slump, closing at 3,307.60 points, up by 1.21%. The Philippine peso moderately strengthened against the US dollar.

References

Estrada guilty of plunder; perjury rap dropped. The Philippine Daily Inquirer, September 12, 2007.

Bibliography

External links
Inquirer.net, Key dates in case of ex-Philippines leader Estrada
GMA NEWS.TV, A one-stop, multimedia microsite: The Estrada plunder trial verdict
GMA NEWS.TV, Estrada Plunder Trial
TOC Plaintiff's Memorandum
Plaintiff's Memorandum
NOTES ON PLUNDER CLOSING STATEMENTS
GMA Video, Court Session on Joseph Estrada's verdict
 GMA Video, Sandigan finds Erap guilty of plunder
GMA Video, Interview with Estrada after conviction
GMA Video, Estradas overcome with sadness, after verdict

2001 in the Philippines
2002 in the Philippines
2003 in the Philippines
2004 in the Philippines
2005 in the Philippines
2006 in the Philippines
2007 in the Philippines
Political corruption in the Philippines
Estrada, Joseph
Presidency of Gloria Macapagal Arroyo
Joseph Estrada